"Street Runner" is a song by American rapper Rod Wave, released on March 10, 2021 as the lead single from his third studio album SoulFly (2021). It was produced by Karltin Bankz, LondnBlue and TnTXD, and samples "Mixed Signals" by Ruth B. The song peaked at number 16 on the Billboard Hot 100.

"Street Runner" inspired the design of a video game of the same name, which Rod Wave launched in a collaboration with Krool Toys to promote the song on March 17, 2021. According to Wave, "Street Runner" is a personal song about the sacrifices I made to pursue this career that I have now. All while never forgetting about the family and loved ones I'm doing it for. This video game brings my story to life beyond the music."

Composition
In the song, Rod Wave reflects on a relationship that he did not have time for, and the "success and chaos" his career has brought him. He sings about having achieved his dreams but still missing someone. The song ends with a voicemail message from a woman “Mallary B.” who tells Wave that she loves and misses him.

Critical reception
Erika Marie of HotNewHipHop called the song "an introspective single that shows the rapper is more focused on building his brands than having a good time".

Music video
The music video was released alongside the single, and was directed and shot by Rod Wave, Yawn Rico and Eye 4 Production. It starts with the announcement of the release date of his then-upcoming album SoulFly before showing Wave's life of touring, taking flights, performing concerts, and filming music videos, while missing the woman he likes.

Charts

Weekly charts

Year-end charts

Certifications

References

2021 singles
2021 songs
Rod Wave songs
Songs written by Rod Wave